Demented is a 1980 American rape and revenge horror film directed by Arthur Jeffreys and starring Sallee Young and Harry Reems.

Plot
The plot involves a woman who, having been raped by a gang of men and institutionalized, suffers nightmares while under the care of her unfaithful husband, and takes a violent revenge when a group of teenage youths decide to play a prank on her.

Cast
Sallee Young as Linda Rodgers
Harry Reems (credited as Bruce Gilchrist) as Matt Rodgers 
Deborah Alter as Annie
Kathryn Clayton as Carol
Bryan Charles as Dr. Dillman
Edward Talbot 'Chip' Matthews as Mark
Mark Justin as Joker
Robert Brooks Mendel as Joker/Rapist
Douglas Price as Joker
Stephen Blood as Joker
Bosco Palazzolo as Manuel

Reception

TV Guide awarded the film two out of five stars, writing, "The film gets off to a slow start, but once Linda's mind snaps and she begins seducing the kids, then dispatching them in assorted grisly fashions, the film actually becomes a fairly funny black comedy."

References

Bibliography

External links 
 
 
 

1980 films
1980 horror films
1980s exploitation films
1980 independent films
1980 thriller films
American independent films
American horror thriller films
American rape and revenge films
1980s English-language films
1980s American films
1980s horror thriller films